Leitneria is a genus of mites in the family Halolaelapidae.

Species
 Leitneria granulatus (Halbert, 1923)
 Leitneria pugio (Karg, 1961)

References

Mesostigmata